Nélson Borges de Freitas, known as Nélson Borges (born 22 January 1955) is a former Brazilian football player.

Club career
He played 4 seasons and 102 games in the Primeira Liga for Estrela Amadora and Farense.

Honours
Estrela Amadora
Taça de Portugal: 1989–90, scored a goal in the first leg of the final
Seleção Paulista 
Copa Presidente da Coréia do Sul: 1977, Champion of the crown President of South Korea, 1977, with 14 goals
Santos 
Paulistão: 1978,
Champion of the championship Paulista of 1978 by Santos FC

References

External links
 

1955 births
Footballers from São Paulo (state)
Living people
Brazilian footballers
Association football midfielders
Santos FC players
America Football Club (RJ) players
S.C. Farense players
Brazilian expatriate footballers
Expatriate footballers in Portugal
Primeira Liga players
Liga Portugal 2 players
C.F. Estrela da Amadora players